|}
{| class="collapsible collapsed" cellpadding="0" cellspacing="0" style="clear:right; float:right; text-align:center; font-weight:bold;" width="280px"
! colspan="3" style="border:1px solid black; background-color: #77DD77;" | Also Ran

The 1986 Epsom Derby was a horse race which took place at Epsom Downs on Wednesday 4 June 1986. It was the 207th running of the Derby, and it was won by Shahrastani. The winner was ridden by Walter Swinburn and trained by Michael Stoute. The prerace favourite Dancing Brave finished second.

Race details
 Sponsor: Ever Ready
 Winner's prize money: £239,260
 Going: Good
 Number of runners: 17
 Winner's time: 2m 37.13s

Full result

 The distances between the horses are shown in lengths or shorter. shd = short-head; hd = head; PU = pulled up.† Trainers are based in Great Britain unless indicated.

Winner's details
Further details of the winner, Shahrastani:

 Foaled: 27 March 1983, in Kentucky, USA
 Sire: Nijinsky; Dam: Shademah (Thatch)
 Owner: HH Aga Khan IV
 Breeder: HH Aga Khan IV
 Rating in 1986 International Classifications: 134

Form analysis

Two-year-old races
Notable runs by the future Derby participants as two-year-olds in 1985.

 Shahrastani – 2nd Haynes, Hanson and Clark Stakes
 Mashkour – 1st Chromacopy Stakes
 Nisnas – 4th Somerville Tattersall Stakes
 Flash of Steel – 1st Beresford Stakes
 Sirk – 2nd Chromacopy Stakes
 Nomrood – 2nd Futurity Stakes (finished 3rd, placed 2nd)
 Jareer – 8th Dewhurst Stakes
 Bold Arrangement – 4th Richmond Stakes, 2nd Seaton Delaval Stakes, 1st Solario Stakes, 3rd Prix de la Salamandre, 2nd Grand Critérium, 4th Futurity Stakes (finished 2nd, placed 4th)
 Arokar – 1st Prix Saint-Roman

The road to Epsom
Early-season appearances in 1986 and trial races prior to running in the Derby.

 Shahrastani – 1st Sandown Classic Trial, 1st Dante Stakes
 Dancing Brave – 1st Craven Stakes, 1st 2,000 Guineas
 Mashkour – 3rd Craven Stakes, 1st White Rose Stakes, 1st Lingfield Derby Trial
 Faraway Dancer – 2nd Craven Stakes, 1st Dee Stakes
 Nisnas – 3rd White Rose Stakes
 Flash of Steel – 1st Tetrarch Stakes, 1st Irish 2,000 Guineas
 Sirk – 3rd Sandown Classic Trial, 2nd Chester Vase, 3rd Dante Stakes
 Sharrood – 7th Craven Stakes, 4th 2,000 Guineas, 3rd Irish 2,000 Guineas
 Mr John – 4th Tetrarch Stakes, 1st Amethyst Stakes, 2nd Irish 2,000 Guineas
 Allez Milord – 1st Predominate Stakes
 Nomrood – 1st Chester Vase, 2nd Dante Stakes
 Bold Arrangement – 3rd Doncaster Mile, 3rd Blue Grass Stakes, 2nd Kentucky Derby
 Arokar – 1st Prix Greffulhe, 2nd Prix Lupin
 Fioravanti – 5th Irish 2,000 Guineas
 Wise Counsellor – 2nd Derrinstown Stud Derby Trial

Subsequent Group 1 wins
Group 1 / Grade I victories after running in the Derby.

 Shahrastani – Irish Derby (1986)
 Dancing Brave – Eclipse Stakes (1986), King George VI and Queen Elizabeth Stakes (1986), Prix de l'Arc de Triomphe (1986)
 Mashkour – San Juan Capistrano Invitational Handicap (1991)
 Allez Milord – Preis von Europa (1986), Oak Tree Invitational Stakes (1987)

Subsequent breeding careers
Leading progeny of participants in the 1986 Epsom Derby.

Sires of Classic winners
Dancing Brave (2nd)
 Commander In Chief - 1st Epsom Derby (1993), 1st Irish Derby (1993)
 Wemyss Bight - 1st Irish Oaks (1993)
 White Muzzle - 1st Derby Italiano (1993)
 Kyoei March - 1st Oka Sho (1997)
 T M Ocean - 1st Oka Sho (2001)

Sires of National Hunt horses
Shahrastani (1st)
 Zabadi - 1st Gerry Feilden Hurdle (1996)
 Padashpan - 1st Morgiana Hurdle (1993)
 Balanak - 1st Dovecote Novices' Hurdle (1995)
 Dariyoun - 3rd Prix du Cadran (1992)
Arokar (15th)
 Topkar - 1st Prix Amadou (1994) - Dam of Top Ling and Top World
 Ytalsa Royale - 1st Prix Ferdinand Dufaure (1995)

Other Stallions
Sharrood (8th) - Grey Shot (1st Goodwood Cup 1996, 1st Kingwell Hurdle 1999), Biwa Hayahide (1st Kikuka-shō 1993), Rambling Bear (1st Palace House Stakes 1999), Merrily (Dam of Dick Turpin)Jareer (12th) - Sagar Pride (3rd Poule d'Essai des Pouliches 1996)Allez Milord (10th) - Exported to Japan - Meisho Motonar (2nd February Stakes 1998)Nomrood (11th) - Exported to Australia - Beaux Art (3rd Caulfield Cup 1995)Then Again (13th) - For The Present (1st Steward's Cup 1994)Bold Arrangement (14th) - Tom Tun (1st Wentworth Stakes 2002)Fioravanti (16th) - Wixon (1st Prix du Petit Couvert 1992)Wise Counsellor (Pulled up) - Exported to Japan - Damsire of Trot StarFlash Of Steel (6th) - Sired minor flat and jumps winners - Exported to Italy - Exported to Australia - Exported to JapanSirk (7th)  - Damsire of Easter DayMashkour (3rd) - Exported to ChileFaraway Dancer (4th) - Exported to South AfricaNisnas (5th) - Exported to Saudi Arabia

References

External links
 Colour Chart – Derby 1986
 youtube.com – Shahrastani – Derby Stakes.

Epsom Derby
 1986
1986 in British sport
Epsom Derby
20th century in Surrey